School District 83 North Okanagan-Shuswap is a school district in British Columbia.  This includes the major center of Salmon Arm and the area around Shuswap Lake as well as the northern Okanagan communities of Armstrong and Enderby.

History
School District 83 was created in 1996 with the merger of School District 21 Armstrong-Spallumcheen and School District 89 Shuswap.

Schools

See also
List of school districts in British Columbia

School districts in the Okanagan
Salmon Arm
83